Palm Beach United, formerly Beaches FC, is an American soccer club based in Jupiter, Florida. They play in the Sunshine Conference of the  National Premier Soccer League.

The team colors are orange and blue.

History 

Beaches FC was announced as a National Premier Soccer League expansion team on January 25, 2017. The club's ownership is composed of Trevor Adair and Levent Guler. Adair is a former coach of the Brown Bears and the Clemson Tigers men's soccer programs. Guler is the head coach of the West Boca Raton High School's boys varsity soccer team.

In 2018 the team was rebranded as Palm Beach United.

References

External links 
Official Twitter

Association football clubs established in 2017
Soccer clubs in Florida
National Premier Soccer League teams
2017 establishments in Florida